Watsonidia porioni is a moth in the family Erebidae first described by Hervé de Toulgoët in 1981. It is found in Panama.

References

Phaegopterina
Moths described in 1981